Numhyd is an oil company founded on 4 April 2003, jointly owned and managed by Algeria's Sonatrach and Tunisia's ETAP, who each own 50%.  It is registered in Jersey, with offices in Algiers and Tunis. Its operations include oil fields in the Illizi basin (eastern Algerian Sahara) and the Kaboudia area offshore in Tunisia.

Sources
 NUMHYD
 Oil and gas sector plays vital role in Tunisia’s economy

Government-owned companies of Africa
Oil and gas companies of Algeria
Oil and gas companies of Tunisia
Algeria–Tunisia relations